Dimethylphenylpiperazinium (DMPP) is a nicotinic acetylcholine receptor agonist which is selective for the ganglionic subtype. One of the earliest reports on the pharmacology of DMPP, describing it as a ganglion-stimulating, hypertensive agent, came from Graham Chen and his co-workers at Parke, Davis & Co. (Now Pfizer)

See also 
 Phenylpiperazine

References 

Nicotinic agonists
Phenylpiperazines
Quaternary ammonium compounds